is a Japanese voice actor and singer employed by 81 Produce as of 2020. His roles included Hayato Kazami in Future GPX Cyber Formula, Ryo Akiyama in Digimon Tamers and Sonic the Hedgehog in the eponymous series since 1998. He came in eighth in the Seiyū Grand Prix in 1994.

Career
When he was studying child psychology as a college student, Kanemaru was working part-time at the Far East Network in Yokota Air Base. At the same time, he was recruited while working as a studio DJ at a department store in Shinjuku, and a few days later he participated in the dubbing session for Urusei Yatsura. After that, he took part in several of Fuji TV's Saturday evening shows such as High School! Kimengumi, Tsuide ni Tonchinkan, and Meimon! Dai San Yakyūbu. At the time, he was employed by Beniya 25-Ji and Dojinsha Production. He got his first lead role in 1991's Future GPX Cyber Formula, where he played Hayato Kazami. He found out about it the day before the recording, when he heard an answering machine on his trip, and rushed home to read the script on the day of the recording. When he appeared in Cyber Formula, he was also working as an English tutor, and one of his students' parents leaked information about him, causing a huge commotion in the adjacent shopping district as anime fans rushed to the place where he was teaching.

During the dubbing of an American television sitcom Growing Pains, a SEGA official who came to look for the role of Sonic heard Kanemaru's performance in the waiting room and cast him in the role of Sonic in Sonic Adventure. This established a new character for Sonic, who could freely switch between English and Japanese, and also led to Kanemaru's own characteristics. His performance in the Sonic series also led to offers from Disney to record children's programs. For Sonic the Hedgehog, the live-action adaptation of the Sonic series, Sonic's voice actor for the Japanese dub was changed to actor Taishi Nakagawa, and at the time of the announcement of the film's release, Kanemaru took to Twitter to express his thoughts and support for the film version of Sonic.

In an interview with Animate Times in 2016, Kanemaru recalled that Cyber Formula helped him get used to singing, as the series had monthly album releases at the time. He was the first in the voice acting industry to be allowed to cover "Ue o Muite Arukō" and recorded it with an a cappella chorus. On his 1993 album Inspired Colors, he also wrote and composed the song "12-Gatsu no Fairy Tale", as well as English covers of "Video Killed the Radio Star" and Kazumasa Oda's "Love Story wa Totsuzen ni" under the title "suddenly" (using the lyrics from Rita Coolidge's version). He has also tried his hand at standard jazz and has performed several live shows with several fellow voice actors, and his jazz numbers mixed with English and Japanese lyrics written himself are well received by all ages.

Filmography

Anime

Films

Video games

Drama CDs

Tokusatsu

Dubbing

References

External links
  
 81 Produce profile 
 
 Jun'ichi Kanemaru at Ryu's Seiyuu Info
 

81 Produce voice actors
Living people
Japanese male video game actors
Japanese male voice actors
Japanese male singer-songwriters
Male voice actors from Yamanashi Prefecture
Musicians from Yamanashi Prefecture
20th-century Japanese male actors
20th-century Japanese male singers
20th-century Japanese singers
21st-century Japanese male actors
21st-century Japanese male singers
21st-century Japanese singers
Year of birth missing (living people)